Invasion is a 2017 Iranian crime film directed by Shahram Mokri. It was screened in the Panorama section at the 68th Berlin International Film Festival.

Cast
 Babak Karimi
 Abed Abest
 Levon Haftvan
 Pedram Sharifi

References

External links
 

2017 crime drama films
2017 films
Iranian crime drama films
2017 LGBT-related films
Iranian LGBT-related films
2010s Persian-language films
One-shot films